Speech and Reality is a book by Eugen Rosenstock-Huessy (1888–1973), German social philosopher and is an English-language introduction to Rosenstock-Huessy’s German-language book, Soziologie. It comprises seven essays that he wrote and revised between 1935 and 1955. Rosenstock-Huessy introduces a new form of social research in which the human subject, as speaker, displaces the subject of orthodox sociology, wherein the subject can be mute. Speech and Reality is an English-language introduction to Rosenstock-Huessy’s Soziologie (sociology) and his method of inquiry for the social sciences, which is based on grammar. Using grammar as a tool, Rosenstock-Huessy describes the preconditions of anarchy, revolution, decadence, and war. John Macquarrie emphasized the importance of Rosenstock-Huessy's language-based methods and Peter Leithart cited the scope of his thinking across the depth and breadth of society.

Overview

Along with Franz Rosenzweig, Ferdinand Ebner, and Martin Buber, Rosenstock-Huessy is a major contributor to "speech thinking," and it is a central concern of several works of his, perhaps the most important, in English, being Speech and Reality. The basic idea of “speech thinking” is that our reality is not only an object to be espied, but an extension of our powers. And of all the powers which constitute us, it is speech, with its calls and responses, vocatives and imperatives, solicitations and appeals, that enables us to undertake collective action and thereby transform ourselves and the world around us. Speech does not merely describe or denote what exists, it enables us to draw out from ourselves possibilities and realities which are yet unrealized.

In place of  Descartes’ "I think therefore I am," which is the clarion call to become lords and masters over nature and thereby to treat nature as a great machine subject to our will and our cognitive capacities, Rosenstock-Huessy taught "I respond, although I will be changed." This is a formulation, which comes from the recognition that life calls us into ever-fresh tasks and that we never approach urgent things already in full knowledge of an outcome. Being open to speech is being open to the various insights and requests, the urgencies and necessities that are encapsulated in speech. It is the recognition that we are mutual creators of each other and the world around us; that is a reality we cannot avoid, though we can easily fail to see what it involves. That our words become flesh is, in fact a variant of another fact—that we dissolve and resolve again in acts of love. Speech thinking, in other words, stands in the closest relationship to the law of love.

Rosenstock-Huessy wrote in Speech and Reality:

Assessment of Speech and Reality
In Commonweal magazine, John Macquarrie writes about Speech and Reality:

Peter Leithart writes on "The Relevance of Eugen Rosenstock-Huessy" and his methods:

References

External links 
 The official web site of the Eugen Rosenstock-Huessy Fund and Argo Books includes a biography, accessed 20 March 2007
 The Norwich Center, Norwich, Vermont, maintains an internet site devoted to an introductory biography and appreciation of Eugen Rosenstock-Huessy, signed by Clinton C. Gardner, President of the Norwich Center, accessed 20 March 2007
Eugen Rosenstock-Huessy Gesellschaft

1970 non-fiction books
Sociology books